Andrea Lyn Helms (née, Stout; born October 28, 1973) is an American gospel music recording artist and musician. She started her music career, in 2011, by performing on Sunday Best on BET. Her release, an extended play, Moving Forward, was released in 2012, by Music World Entertainment. This EP was her breakthrough release upon the Billboard magazine charts. She released, Clap Your Hands, in 2014, with Dream Records.

Early life and background
Helms was born, Andrea Lyn Stout, on October 28, 1973, in Odessa, Texas, the daughter of Reverend Johnny Ray Stout and Jacqueline Peter, where her father was the pastor at Friendship Church, while he died on November 1, 2009. In 1993, she married her husband, Michael Helms; they were born exactly two years apart, and together they have a son, Jalyn. She and her husband are the pastors of Friendship Church in Denton, Texas.

Music career
Her music career started in 2011, with the appearance on BET's reality television signing competition, Sunday Best, where she finished was a finalist of season 4, and this got her a recording contract. She released, an extended play, Moving Forward, on March 6, 2012, with Music World. This EP was her breakthrough album upon the Billboard magazine charts, where it placed on The Billboard 200, Top Gospel Albums and Independent Albums charts, peaking at Nos. 77, 2, and 11, correspondingly. Her subsequent release, a studio album, Clap Your Hands, was released on October 28, 2014, from Dream Records. The album peaked at No. 6 on the Top Gospel Albums chart.

Discography
Studio albums

EPs

References

External links
New Release Today profile

1973 births
Living people
American gospel singers
Musicians from Texas
Songwriters from Texas
21st-century American singers